Asaba is the capital city of Delta State, Nigeria

Asaba may also refer to:
 Asaba, Shizuoka, town in Japan
 Akira Asaba (麻羽 央), a character in the manga series Magical Trans! 
 Carl Asaba (born 1973), English footballer
 Katsumi Asaba (born 1940), Japanese art director